Bullock's Park was an estate in Bristol, England between College Green and Brandon Hill.  The last owner, Nathaniel Day, obtained permission to develop it in 1740 although building did not begin until 1761.  The area now corresponds to Park Street, Berkeley Square and Berkeley Crescent.

References

 Andrew Foyle, 'Pevsner Architectural Guides: Bristol', Yale University Press (2004) 
 Walter Ison, The Georgian Buildings of Bristol, Kingsmead Press (1978) 

Areas of Bristol
18th century in Bristol